Mosalsky District is an administrative and municipal district (raion), one of the  twenty-four in Kaluga Oblast, Russia. It is located in the west of the oblast. Its administrative center is the town of Mosalsk.
Population:  10,357 (2002 Census);  The population of Mosalsk accounts for 46.4% of the district's total population.

References

Notes

Sources

Districts of Kaluga Oblast